Baron Édouard-Émile-Albert de Laveleye (Ghent, 22 October 1854-Brussels, 23 November 1938) was a Belgian mining engineer, financier and writer. He was son of Émile de Laveleye (1822-1892), a famed economist.

He made several investment trips in Latin America. His nephew was Victor de Laveleye, the Belgian government in exile's spokesman in London during World War II.

Sports
He was the first chairman of the Belgian Football Association (1895–1924), and the president of the Belgian Olympic Committee. For his services, he was made the first honorary member of FIFA. This honor was given to him after convincing representatives of The Football Association, the association that included members of the British Home Nations, to join FIFA rather than remain independent. On April 14, 1905 The Football Association recognized the authority of FIFA. This allowed FIFA to hold its first international football competition.  In allying the Football Association in the French FIFA, each of the home nations joined as equal members, a legacy maintained today.

On February 18, 1906, in the Hotel Ravenstein in Brussels, Laveleye formed the Belgian Olympic Committee, and was elected the group's first president. In this role he posted a bid for Belgium on March 27, 1912 to host the 1920 Olympics. The games were successfully awarded to Antwerp, much because of his influence and the effect World War I had on the nation.  This was the only time they have been held in Belgium.

Writings
 Excursion aux nouvelles découvertes minières du Colorado 1878
 Chicago et la traversée du continent - Notes d'un voyage aux États-Unis 1880

References

Sportspeople from Ghent
Belgian football managers
Football people in Belgium
Belgium national football team managers
1854 births
1938 deaths